Ali Pangalian M. Balindong (born 1 January 1940) is a Filipino lawyer and politician. He is the current speaker of the Bangsamoro Parliament. He is also a former deputy speaker of the Philippine House of Representatives and a member of the 1971 Philippine Constitutional Convention.

Early life 
Born to a Muslim Moro family in Pualas, Lanao del Sur on 1 January 1940, Balindong is the eldest son of Sultan Amer Macaorao Balindong, former mayor of the Municipality of Malabang, and Hajjatu Maimona Marohom Balindong. He studied at the Malabang Central Elementary School and graduated in 1954. He then went to Our Lady of Peace High School and graduated in 1958. He took up Bachelor of Arts Major in Political Science at the Manuel L. Quezon University and graduated in 1962. He studied law at the same university and graduated in 1966 with a Bachelor of Laws degree (LL.B.). He pursued further studies later and earned his Master of Public Administration degree from Mindanao State University.

Career 
Balindong engaged in private legal practice and served as legal counsel for the Moro National Liberation Front (MNLF) which works for peace initiatives with the government. In 1971, he joined the Philippine Constitutional Convention representing the Lone District of Lanao del Sur. He started his political career when he held the post of Assemblyman from 1990 to 1993 representing the 2nd District of Lanao del Sur and was elected as Speaker of the Regional Legislative Assemblyman of the Autonomous Region in Muslim Mindanao (ARMM) between 1991 and 1993.

In 1995, Balindong ran and was elected as the congressional representative of the 2nd congressional district of Lanao del Sur during the 10th Congress. He ran again in 2007 and became a representative during the 14th, 15th, and 16th Congresses. In 2013, he rose to the deputy speaker post of the House of Representatives until 2016.

In 2018, under Executive Order No. 10, Balindong was appointed by President Rodrigo Duterte as a member of the 25-member Consultative Committee to Review the 1987 Philippine Constitution, a committee composed of former government officials, veteran lawyers, and academicians tasked by Duterte to craft a federal constitution.

Key legislation

Bangsamoro Organic Law (BOL) 
For most of his political life, Balindong advocated the age-old quest for self-determination of Muslim Filipinos in Mindanao. He introduced and authored the Bangsamoro Basic Law (BBL), which was later renamed the Bangsamoro Organic Law (BOL), in the 16th Congress. During a privilege speech, he stated that he had always believed that such a measure would be essential in ushering unity in Mindanao and the entire country, where Filipino Muslims, Christians, Lumads, and virtually all sectors of the Filipino society could live in harmony, peace, and inclusive prosperity. This to him would mark the end of a 400-year struggle for independence and at the same guarantee every Muslim's right to life, property, and prosperity.

During the presidency of Rodrigo Duterte, the BOL was passed by the Philippine Senate on 23 July 2018, passed by the House of Representatives on 24 July 2018, and signed into law by Duterte on 26 July 2018. The law provided for the establishment of the Bangsamoro Autonomous Region to replace the Autonomous Region in Muslim Mindanao.

The Moro History, Culture and Identity Studies Act 
During the 16th Congress, Balindong filed House Bill No. 4832 or “The Moro History, Culture and Identity Studies Act", which would mandate the teaching of Moro history, culture, and identity in the higher education curriculum in the entire country. This bill passed the House of Representatives but did not reach the Senate.

Balindong has sough to highlight the ethnicity, shared origins or commonalities between Muslims and non-Muslims to foster respect and positive relationships between minority and majority groups.

Balindong said, “While Filipino and Muslim cultures may have differences, it is a fact that they are bound by a common heritage, the land they call the Philippines, and they have a lot in common, on top of which, is the clamor for peace.” Though Filipino and Muslim cultures have differences, peace is attainable through understanding, respect, and tolerance for cultural and religious diversities.

National Commission on Muslim Filipinos Act 
Another vital legislative initiative Balindong sponsored is Republic Act No. 9997, also known as the “National Commission on Muslim Filipinos Act of 2009”, which was enacted into law on February 8, 2010. This act created the National Commission on Muslim Filipinos (NCMF) that is mandated to preserve and develop the culture, tradition, institutions, and well-being of Muslim Filipinos in conformity with the country's laws and in consonance with national unity and development.

House Bill No. 1447 
Balindong filed and lobbied for House Bill No. 1447, which prohibits the use of the words “Muslim” or “Christian” in mass media to describe any person suspected of or convicted for committing criminal or unlawful actions. He argued that if the media puts labels on suspects and convicted criminals regarding their nationality, ethnicity, and religious affiliation it fosters negative bias to people who share their affiliation, affecting the collective image of such groups. He cites that there is negative reception whenever other countries branded a housemaid as Pinay for the simple reason that there are so many Filipino women workers working as maids. “Why then is our media doing the same to our Muslim countrymen? Indeed, our Muslim brothers are a minority among the Filipino majority, but should be treated with the same respect and privileges as any other Batangueño, Visayan or other Filipino citizens.”

Synchronized National and Local Elections Act 
This act synchronizes ARMM elections with the national elections which started with the 2013 elections.

Principles and Ideals 
In one of his privilege speeches Balindong said, "If some sector of society stands in the way of peace and progress, something must be done to make them toe the line. Being at odds with one another is not contributing to progress despite the claim of economic gains brought about by the appreciation of the Peso." He added that whatever it is that something must be given, it must be sincere so that there would be no need to go back every now and then to the negotiating table, thus, there will no longer have reason to fight each other again. "Unity must not be dictated. The unity needed must come from the Moro, and not dictated by somebody else but by the events of the day."

Balindong believes in the power of elixir of eternal youth, and that is found in obedience to the principles of the Qur'an and love of service. When he decided to run for the Provincial Governor position, he looked at it not as a personal or political ambition, but an extension of his desire to continue serving the people and his beloved Philippines. To him, public service is not as a job or work; it is a way of life.

Balindong, having gone through the crucibles of life, both personal and professional, acknowledges that experience is the best teacher of life. With such principles, he deserves without a doubt to continue serving the people and will continue to serve in whatever capacity he can.

When the BBL failed to pass into law, Balindong lamented it because the next generation will inherit the vicious cycle of war and peace and all efforts, public hearings, and debates were all thrown into the wastebasket.

References

1940 births
People from Lanao del Sur
Members of the Bangsamoro Transition Authority Parliament
Members of the House of Representatives of the Philippines from Lanao del Sur
Living people
Filipino Muslims